Checca is a town in the Cusco Region of Peru (the geographical coordinates of the city: 14° 28' 22" South, 71° 23' 38" West). Its population is 3,810. The city maintains average temperatures of at least 4.1 to 8.1 degrees Celsius throughout the year, with an average precipitation of 837.8 millimeters.

References 

 

Populated places in the Cusco Region